Édouard de Reszke (22 December 185325 May 1917) was a Polish bass from  Warsaw. A member of the musical Reszke family, he was a successful opera singer, as were his brother Jean and his sister Josephine. He made his debut in Aida in Paris on 22 April 1876.

Born with an impressive natural voice and equipped with compelling histrionic skills, he became one of the most illustrious opera singers active in Europe and America during the late-Victorian era. He is most famous for his role as Mephistopheles in Faust. He was also known for his roles as Leporello, Sachs, and Hagen. When in London, the Reszke brothers performed for Queen Victoria during gala performances at the Royal Opera House or command performances at Windsor Castle. He was awarded the Royal Victorian Order (R.V.O.) from the Queen. The Reszke brothers were entertained near London by Lady de Grey, a patron of the arts.

After he retired from the stage, he taught singing until he had significant health problems. He and his family suffered during the war, cut off from others, with shooting through opposite sides of the house. His health worsened during the war and he died in 1917.

Early life
Édouard August Reszke was born to Jan Reszke and Emilja (also Emilie) Ufniarska on 22 December 1853. His parents operated the Hôtel de Saxe (de) in the center of Warsaw, which catered to artists from Moscow, Berlin, and Paris. It adjoined their residence. His mother, a mezzo-soprano, had a clear, powerful voice. His father, a baritone, played the violin and wrote songs for his wife. The Reszkes held concerts on Friday nights with duets, arias and choral music. Both of his parents performed at charity events.

His siblings were Emilia, Jean (born 1850), Josephine (1855), and Victor (1859). Emilja taught her children to sing; all of whom were talented singers. At times the four oldest children, called the Reszke Quartet, performed together. Viktor was not interested in music. Josephine, Jean, and Édouard sang at a soirée in 1869.

Reszke attended an agricultural college in Germany for two years. When he returned to Warsaw, Jean noticed that his brother's voice had deepened significantly. Wanting to understand how his singing voice changed, Jean played the piano while Reszke sang, after which he told his parents that with his brother's talent, he should change his career goals and pursue an opera career. He followed his desired to sing over his parents' plan for a career in agriculture. He went to Italy and studied under Francesco Steller and later the retired baritone Filippo Coletti, who was also a friend. He studied with Giovanni Sbriglia in Paris.

By 1875, his sister Josephine was a prima donna at the Paris Opera; Reszke and his mother travelled with her. He sang at musicals as an amateur. Beginning in 1876, the Reszke brothers became known amongst Paris society and composers for their singing talent.

Career

Stage 

Reszke debuted in Aida in Paris on 22 April 1876. He was chosen by the composer Giuseppe Verdi for the role as the King of Egypt. Fortunately, when he auditioned he already knew the opera well, because he was hired just days before the performance. He was asked to grow a beard so that he looked more like a king than the young man that he was. That year, Reszke began using the French version of his surname: de Reszke. Josephine and Jean, who had careers as opera singers, changed their surname that year, too. After Aida, he performed at the Théâtre des Italiens for two seasons.

In 1879, he performed in Maria Tudor at the Teatro alla Scala and Indra in the premiere of Le roi de Lahore in Milan. The role of Ilda was created for him by Jules Massenet. He sang at Covent Garden in London in 1880. The following year, he performed in The Prodigal Son, Simon Boccanegra, and Ernani. He performed as Charles V in Don Giovanni d'Austria and the king in Elda in southern cities including Lisbon, Trieste, and Turin.

He performed in Italian opera at Covent Garden in London. While in the capital of England, the Reszkes were often entertained at the residence of Lady de Grey, who treated the men like royalty and enjoyed their senses of humor. One night they missed their train for London to make their perform at Covent Garden, a guest remembered he was the honorary president of the local fire brigade and arranged for them to be taken to London in good speed.

Reszke admired his brother, who was the leader of the two. He gladly sacrificed opportunities for a better and more independent career to perform with him, which began after Jean had established himself as a tenor. In 1884, they appeared in Hérodiade at the Théâtre-Italien. Josephine joined her brothers in the role of Salome later in the run. In Le Cid, Jean had the title role and Reszke created the role of Don Diègue. They performed in Roméo et Juliette and Don Giovanni.

Reszke and his brother Jean and sister Josephine were described as a jolly trio:

In 1887, they performed in Gounod's Faust at the Paris Opéra. Reszke was best known for his role as Mephistopheles, overshadowing his brother. He was compared to Faure, a tenor, who had previous performed as the legendary demon. He excelled as Mephistopheles due to his genuine bass voice and his imposing physical presence. Reszke developed a reputation as a great singer in that year.

The brothers were at Covent Garden in London from 1887 to 1890. They performed in French productions of a full-length version of Faust as well as Les Huguenots with Jean Lassalle and under the impresario Augustus Harris. With these operas, the men added Wagner operas, beginning with Lohengrin and Die Meistersinger von Nürnberg , sung in Italian. This was the beginning of the addition of Wagner works to the brothers' repertoire.

The Reszkes performed in Warsaw and Russia. From Poland, the Reszkes were Russian citizens. During the winter of 1889–1890, they were called to a command performance by the Tsar of Russia, which made Jean nervous. The performance, and other command performances, went well for the Tsar, who ennobled the Reszkes in appreciation. More than three decades earlier, their father Jan Reszke was exiled to Siberia in 1863 by the Russian government for his leadership role in the January Uprising; he was there five years.

They frequently performed together in the United States, beginning in Chicago then New York's Metropolitan Opera in 1891. They starred with Nellie Melba in Elaine by Bemberg. Maurice Grau of Abbey, Schoeffel and Grau had a formula for winning casts: the Reszke brothers, Lassalle, Plancon, and two prima donnas. According to The New York Times, that period was considered the "golden days" of art and great voices. He and his brother were among the list of well-known opera singers from Poland.

Reszke performed a wide range of roles in French, German and Italian operas, including works by Wagner, Verdi, Gounod, and Meyerbeer. In addition to his role as Mephistopheles, he was also known for his roles as Leporello, Sachs, and Hagen.

A tall, genial man, Reszke possessed a big, smooth, flexible and ripe-toned voice that matched his imposing physique and extroverted personality. He had a "full, resonant bass, capable of sending forth notes of immense volume or those of the most tender quality. His appearance was that of a broad-shouldered giant, with fair skin and blue eyes, and his stage presence was imposing.

In 1903, he retired from the stage and helped his brother teach singing in Paris,  and four years later opened a singing school in London. In 1909, he closed his school in London due to recurring bouts of bronchitis and dizziness and began to teach in Warsaw, which he had to stop due to his health problems prior to World War I.

Queen Victoria
In the 25 years since Prince Albert's death, Queen Victoria did little entertaining, but in 1889 she issued a command for Emma Albani and the Reszke brothers to join her at Windsor Castle. The three performed solos and duets from L'Étoile du Nord, Lohengrin, Faust, Sweet Bird, Carmen, and La traviata. The Queen expressed her appreciation while "smiling and full of kindness". The same year, they performed a gala performance for the Shah of Persia. In 1890, after a performance of Faust at Windsor Castle, Reszke was given the Royal Victorian Order by the Queen, as was his brother fourteen months earlier.

The Queen wrote of the Reszkes in her diary:

Recordings 

Reszke made three records for commercial release that were recorded by the Columbia Phonograph Company in 1903.

Mapleson Cylinders, primitive recordings made privately during an actual performance at the Metropolitan Opera in 1901, exist. It has been released with other performances on CD by the Symposium label.

Personal life 

Reszke married Helene Schütze in 1885. Her brother Willie was secretary to the Reszke brothers. Her sister Félia Litvinne, born Françoise-Jeanne Schütz, sang with the men. With Helene, they had four daughters, one of whom was Minia (Emilie). She was close with both her father and her uncle Jean. When her father was to return home, she waited for him with his favorite dog. Minia considered her father to be the "most good" man she had known and was considered so by many others. Emma Eames said, "He was like a great big St. Bernard. You always wanted to pat him."

Reszke's best friend in the United States was Laura Tolman (Tolmanina), a cellist. He spent evenings with her, listening to her play her cello, beginning in the early 1890s. They saw each other until he retired from the stage and left the country. He had intended to return for a visit with her, but he never did. They continued to correspond. Among the gifts that he gave her was a St. Bernard to protect her.

While they were single, the brothers spent the summers at Borowno, near Klomnice, where they owned an ancient castle or chateau of French and Russian architecture. It had been unchanged since it was rebuilt in 1791. It had a kitchen garden of several acres, was amongst thousands of acres of forest, and was the site of their first stud-farm. The stud farm and racing stable at Borowno employed about 400 local people, which was most of the residents of the village.

Reszke built a house near Garnek, Poland about 1895. It was his main residence in Poland and he owned a property named Klobukowice, which had one simple house. Jean had a manor house in Skrzydlów. It was six miles from Borowno, where he lived most of the time. He also had property at Zdrowa and Chorzenice. The Warta winds its way through the brothers' estates. Ponds and lakes on the estate were stocked with fish, including perch, trout, and carp. Deer, wild boars, turkey, and wolves lived in their forests. They farmed and raised cattle.

World War I
At the start of World War I (1914), residents of Warsaw had been told to flee the city for their safety. Children were told to cross the Alexandrian Bridge (pl), and that they would return later. As children marched across the bridge, Reszke sang Jescze Polska nie zginęła (pl) (English: Poland Is Not Yet Lost).

He retired to his estate in Poland, where he was adversely affected by the outbreak of World War I in Europe in 1914. He, his wife, and his daughters were stuck at their estate in Granek, cut off from his brother in Paris by the fighting. He had a difficult time earning money for his family and they lived in destitution during the war. At the start of the war, lines of communication were closed to them. His 12,000-acre estate called Borowno was in ruins and they lived in the cellar for one year. Princess and Prince Lubomirski, their neighbors, lived underground with them. They had little food and were generally unsuccessful foraging for food. The Russian and German troops were on opposite sides of their house and during their conflict they shot through the house. Having run out of coal and with just a handful grain, they were cold and hungry. After the troops left the area, they were somewhat comfortable for a time, but then had to hide out in a cold cave for their protection. After that they returned home. Reszke became ill and suffered from crippling rheumatism. He became very thin and unable to lie down, so he spent his time in an arm chair for a while. He was cared for by his wife and children, during which time he told funny and interesting stories about his career to lighten the mood.

Reszke died of illness on 25 May 1917 in Garnek, near Częstochowa, Poland ( from the village of Borowno.) or at his estate in Erietrikov, Poland. He was buried at the Michalski family tomb at the Borowno estate. Daughter Minia comforted Jean after her father's death, and was with Jean when he died.

Appearances

Royal Opera House, Covent Garden 

His appearances at the Royal Opera House at Covent Garden include:
 1880 — Royal Italian Opera Season from 13 April to 17 July
 as Don Basilio in The Barber of Seville (5, shared)
 as St. Bris in Les Huguenots (3, shared)
 as Giorgio in I puritani (3)
 as Indra in Le roi de Lahore (3, debut at Covent Garden in this role 13 April 1880)
 as Count Rodolfo in La sonnambula (5, shared)
 1881 — Royal Italian Opera Season from 19 April to 23 July
 as Don Basilio in The Barber of Seville (2)
 as Gudal in The Demon (4)
 as Walter in Guillaume Tell (3)
 as St. Bris in Les Huguenots (3)
 as The Prefect in Linda di Chamounix (2)
 as Giorgio in I puritani (1)
 as Frère Laurent in Roméo et Juliette (2)
 as Count Rodolfo in La sonnambula (2)
 1882 — Royal Italian Opera Season from 18 April to 20 July
 as Don Basilio in The Barber of Seville (4)
 as Walter in Guillaume Tell (2)
 as St. Bris in Les Huguenots (1)
 as Giorgio in I puritani (1)
 as Frère Laurent in Roméo et Juliette (1)
 as Count Rodolfo in La sonnambula (2)
 as Senon in Velléda (3)
 1883 — Royal Italian Opera Season from 1 May to 21 July
 as Don Basilio in The Barber of Seville (2)
 as Dalando in The Flying Dutchman (2)
 as Walter in Guillaume Tell (2)
 as Alvise in La Gioconda (7)
 as St. Bris in Les Huguenots (3)
 as Heinrich in Lohengrin (2)
 as Almaviva in The Marriage of Figaro (2)
 as Giorgio in I puritani (1)
 as Count Rodolfo in La sonnambula (3)
 1884 — Royal Italian Opera Season from 29 April to 26 July
 as Don Basilio in The Barber of Seville (2)
 as Czar Peter in L'étoile du nord (3)
 as Méphistophélès in Faust (5)
 as Alvise in La Gioconda (3)
 as St. Bris in Les Huguenots (4)
 as The Prefect in Linda di Chamounix (1)
 as (illegible data) in Lucrezia Borgia (2)
 as Almaviva in The Marriage of Figaro (4)
 as (illegible data) in Semiramide (1)
 as Hagen in Sigurd (3)
 1888 — Royal Italian Opera Season from 15 May to 21 July
 as Don Pedro in L'Africaine (2)
 as Don Basilio in The Barber of Seville (1)
 as Méphistophélès in Faust (7, shared)
 as Walter in Guillaume Tell (2)
 as St. Bris in Les Huguenots (4)
 as Heinrich in Lohengrin (6)
 as Sarastro in The Magic Flute (1)
 as Mefistofele in Mefistofele (1)
 1889 — Royal Italian Opera Season from 18 May to 27 July
 as Méphistophélès in Faust (7, shared)
 as Walter in Guillaume Tell (2)
 as St. Bris in Les Huguenots (3)
 as Heinrich in Lohengrin (6, shared)
 as Frère Laurent in Roméo et Juliette (7)
 as Count Rodolfo in La sonnambula (2)
 1890 — Royal Italian Opera Season from 19 May to 28 July
 as Méphistophélès in Faust (6, shared)
 as St. Bris in Les Huguenots (6, shared)
 as Heinrich in Lohengrin (5)
 as Zacharie in Le prophète (5)
 as Frère Laurent in Roméo et Juliette (5)
 as Count Rodolfo in La sonnambula (1)
 1891 — Royal Italian Opera Season from 6 April to 27 July
 as Leporello in Don Giovanni (5, shared)
 as Méphistophélès in Faust (12, shared)
 as St. Bris in Les Huguenots (8)
 as Heinrich in Lohengrin (9)
 as Plumketto in Martha (2)
 as Mefistofele in Mefistofele (2)
 as Zacharie in Le Prophète (3)
 as Frère Laurent in Roméo et Juliette (8, shared)
 1892 — Royal Italian Opera Season from 16 May to 28 July
 as Leporello in Don Giovanni (2)
 as L'Eremite in Elaine (5)
 as Dalando in The Flying Dutchman (1)
 as St. Bris in Les Huguenots (1)
 as Heinrich in Lohengrin (5, shared)
 as Almaviva in The Marriage of Figaro (2)
 as Zacharie in Le prophète (1)
 as Frère Laurent in Roméo et Juliette (3)
 1893 — Royal Opera Season from 15 May to 29 July
 as Méphistophélès in Faust (6, shared)
 as Dalando in The Flying Dutchman (2)
 as St. Bris in Les Huguenots (2)
 as Heinrich in Lohengrin (6, shared)
 as Frère Laurent in Roméo et Juliette (7, shared)
 1894 — Royal Opera Season from 15 May to 29 July
 as Ramfis in Aida (2)
 as L'Eremite in Elaine (2)
 as Méphistophélès in Faust (7, shared)
 as The Roundhead Colonel in The Lady of Longford (2)
 as Heinrich in Lohengrin (4)
 as Frère Laurent in Roméo et Juliette (7)
 1896 — Royal Opera Season from 11 May to 28 July
 as Méphistophélès in Faust (6, shared)
 as Heinrich in Lohengrin (5, shared)
 as Plumketto in Martha (2)
 as Mefistofele in Mefistofele (2, shared)
 as Hans Sachs in Die Meistersinger von Nürnberg (5)
 as Frère Laurent in Roméo et Juliette (8, shared)
 as King Mark in Tristan und Isolde (4)
 1897 — Royal Opera Season from 10 May to 28 July
 as Méphistophélès in Faust (7)
 as Marcel in Les Huguenots (5, shared)
 as Heinrich in Lohengrin (7)
 as Hans Sachs in Die Meistersinger (3)
 as Almaviva in The Marriage of Figaro (2)
 as Frère Laurent in Roméo et Juliette (6, shared)
 as Der Wanderer in Siegfried (4)
 as King Mark in Tristan und Isolde (3)
 1898 — Royal Opera Season from 9 May to 16 July
 as Don Basilio in The Barber of Seville (1)
 as Leporello in Don Giovanni (1)
 as Méphistophélès in Faust (7, shared)
 as Hagen in Götterdämmerung (3)
 as Heinrich in Lohengrin (7, shared)
 as Hans Sachs in Die Meistersinger (4)
 as Almaviva in The Marriage of Figaro (2, shared)
 as King Mark in Tristan und Isolde (4, shared)
 as Frère Laurent in Roméo et Juliette (at least once)
 1899 — Royal Opera Season from 8 May to 24 July
 as Leporello in Don Giovanni (3)
 as Méphistophélès in Faust (8, shared)
 as St. Bris in Les Huguenots (2, shared)
 as Heinrich in Lohengrin (6, shared)
 as Frère Laurent in Roméo et Juliette (5, shared)
 as King Mark in Tristan und Isolde (4)
 1900 — Royal Opera Season from 14 May to 30 July
 as Don Basilio in The Barber of Seville (1)
 as Leporello in Don Giovanni (2)
 as Méphistophélès in Faust (8, shared)
 as Marcel in Les Huguenots (2)
 as Heinrich in Lohengrin (6, shared)
 as Frère Laurent in Roméo et Juliette (5, shared)
 as Ramfis in Aida (at least once)

Gala and command performances 
Gala and command performances by Jean and Édouard de Reszke at Covent Garden and Command Performances at Windsor Castle:

 2 July 1889 — Gala in honour of the Shah of Persia:
Éduoard as Mephistofele in Act I of Mefistofele and as Mefistofele in Act 4 of Faust
Jean as Faust in Act 4 of Faust
 8 July 1891 — Visit of the Emperor and Empress of Germany
Éduoard as Enrico in Act 1 of Lohengrin, as Laurent in Act 4 of Roméo et Juliette and as San Bris in Act 4 of Les Huguenots
Jean as Lohengrin in Act 1 of Lohengrin, as Romeo in Act 4 of Roméo et Juliette and as Raoul in Act 4 of Les Huguenots
4 July 1893 — Gala in honour of the marriage of the Duke of York and Princess Mary of Teck
Éduoard as Laurent in Roméo et Juliette
Jean as Romeo in Roméo et Juliette
23 June 1897 — 60th Anniversary of Queen Victoria's accession
Éduoard as Laurent in Act 3 of Roméo et Juliette
Jean as Romeo in Act 3 of Roméo et Juliette
27 June 1898 — Command Performance at Windsor Castle (no data on programme)
24 May 1899 — Command Performance at Windsor Castle
Éduoard as Enrico in Lohengrin
Jean as Lohengrin in Lohengrin
16 July 1900 — Command Performance at Windsor Castle
Éduoard as Mefistofele in Faust

Notes

References

Sources

External links 

1853 births
1917 deaths
Operatic basses
19th-century Polish male opera singers
Musicians from Warsaw